Pavel Alekseyevich Melyoshin (born 25 March 2004) is a Russian footballer who plays as a forward for Spartak Moscow.

Career
Melyoshin made his debut for the senior team of Spartak Moscow on 30 August 2022 in a Russian Cup game against Krylia Sovetov Samara and scored the only goal of the game in a 1–0 Spartak victory. He made his Russian Premier League debut for Spartak on 11 September 2022 against FC Rostov. In his next start, Spartak's next Russian Cup game against Fakel Voronezh on 15 September 2022, Melyoshin scored once again.

Personal life
His father Aleksei Melyoshin won the Russian Premier League four times with Spartak Moscow.

Career statistics

References

External links
 
 
 

Living people
2004 births
People from Shchyolkovsky District
Sportspeople from Moscow Oblast
Russian footballers
Association football forwards
Russian Premier League players
FC Spartak Moscow players